Belén Fabra (born 3 November 1977) is a Spanish actress.

Career
Belén Fabra started by playing small roles in numerous theater plays, films and television series.

She made her breakthrough with the 2007 play Plataforma, for which she was nominated for the Premios Max and the Valle-Inclán de Teatro Award.

Fabra first came to prominence in the cinema with the 2007 film Canciones de amor en Lolita's Club, directed by Vicente Aranda.

She was nominated for the Gaudí Award for Best Performance by an Actress in a Leading Role for her role in the "notorious" 2008 erotic film Diario de una ninfómana. She is currently working in two films, Flores negras and L'estació de l'oblit.

Personal life
Belén Fabra was born on 3 November 1977 in Tortosa, Tarragona, Catalonia, Spain as Belén Fabra Homedes. She is an actress, known for Diary of a Nymphomaniac (2008), Gran Reserva (2010) and The Ministry of Time (2015). Belén is fluent in Catalan, Spanish and English and she can  speak Italian.

Filmography

Film
 L'estratègia del cucut (2001) (TV)
 El lado oscuro del corazón 2 (2001)
 Carles, príncep de Viana (2001) (TV)
 Joc de mentides (2003) (TV)
 Mai storie d'amore in cucina (2004) (TV)
 Pactar amb el gat (2007)
 Canciones de amor en Lolita's Club (2007)
 Diario de una Ninfómana (2008)
 Flores negras (2009)
 L'estació de l'oblit (2009)
 Voces (2020)

Television
 Majoria absoluta (2002)
 Pepe Carvalho (2003)
 Hospital Central (2006)
 Planta 25 (2007)
 Positus (2007)
 Zoo (2008)
 Imperium (2012)
 Origin (2018)

Theater
 Què de què (l'actualitat a escena) (2001)
 Migracions.es (2003)
 Happy Hour (2005)
 La fam (2006)
 Tirant lo Blanc (2007)
 Plataforma (2007)
 Jugar amb un tigre (2008)

Awards and nominations
 Gaudí Awards
 2008: Best Performance by an Actress in a Leading Role (Diario de una ninfómana) — Nominated
 Premios Max de las artes escénicas
 2007: Best Featured Actress in a Play (Plataforma) — Nominated
 Premios Valle-Inclán
 2007: Best Actress in a Supporting Role (Plataforma) — Nominated

References

External links
 

1977 births
Living people
People from Tortosa
Spanish film actresses
Spanish television actresses
Spanish stage actresses
Spanish female models
Film actresses from Catalonia
Television actresses from Catalonia
Stage actresses from Catalonia
21st-century Spanish actresses